The 2017 Queensland state election was held on 25 November 2017 to elect all 93 members of the Legislative Assembly of Queensland, the unicameral Parliament of Queensland.

The first-term incumbent Labor government, led by Premier Annastacia Palaszczuk, won a second term in government. They were challenged by the Liberal National opposition, led by Opposition Leader Tim Nicholls and minor parties
One Nation, Katter's Australian Party and the Greens. The 2015 election outcome had delivered a hung parliament with 44 seats to the Labor opposition, 42 seats to the one-term Liberal National government, and three to the crossbench including two to Katter's Australian Party. Just one seat short of majority government, Labor was able to form minority government with confidence and supply support from sole independent MP Peter Wellington, while retaining the right to otherwise vote on conscience. During the parliamentary term, Labor MPs Billy Gordon and Rob Pyne became independent MPs, however they both indicated they would provide confidence and supply support for the government.

Amendments to electoral laws increased the number of seats by four from 89 to 93 and changed the optional preferential voting system to compulsory full-preferential voting. A 2016 referendum also replaced the state's unfixed maximum three-year terms with fixed four-year terms, but these will not apply until the 2020 election. The day after the election, ABC election analyst Antony Green predicted that Labor would win up to 48 seats and was likely to form government in its own right. By 6 December, several news agencies reported that Labor had won a majority of seats in the Parliament. With the redistribution increasing the size of parliament from 89 seats to 93 seats, Labor increased its representation by a net seven seats to a total of 48 seats, an increase of four since the last election and a notional increase of one since the redistribution, allowing it to form government in its own right by two seats. The Liberal National opposition decreased their representation by a net three seats to a total of 39 seats, a decrease of two seats since the last election and a notional decrease of five since the redistribution. On the crossbench, Katter's Australian Party won three seats, an increase of one since the last election and a notional increase of two since the redistribution, one new independent candidate won a seat while all the incumbent independents lost their seats. One Nation won its first seat since 2009 and the Greens won a seat at a state election for the first time.

On 8 December 2017, Opposition Leader Tim Nicholls conceded defeat and announced he would step down as leader of the party. Later that day, Palaszczuk visited Government House and was invited to form a majority government by the Governor. The Second Palaszczuk Ministry was subsequently sworn in by the Governor on 12 December 2017. This marked the tenth time in the last eleven elections that Queensland Labor has won government; it won eight consecutive election victories from 1989 to 2009, and was only out of government from 1996 to 1998 when Labor lost its parliamentary majority as well as from 2012 to 2015 following the Liberal National Party's 2012 landslide win.

Results

|}
Independent: Sandy Bolton (Noosa)

Seats changing hands

The seats of Burdekin, Mansfield, and Mount Ommaney were won by the LNP at the 2015 election, but redistributions in 2016 made them notionally Labor seats.

Post-election pendulum

Milestones
This election resulted in a number of historical milestones being achieved for the representation in the Queensland Parliament. These include:
 the first Australian woman state premier to win government from Opposition and then be re-elected, Annastacia Palaszczuk;
 the election of the first Torres Strait Islander, Cynthia Lui;
 the election of the first South Sea Islander, Stephen Andrew; and
 the election of the first Queensland Greens MP, Michael Berkman (the first ever Queensland MP Ronan Lee was elected under the Australian Labor Party, and lost his re-election bid after defecting to the Greens).

Political donations
Prior to the election, the Shooting Industry Foundation of Australia used $550,000 to launch an advertising campaign, named Flick'em, in an effort to urge voters to put both major parties last in ballot paper preferences. This campaign boosted votes for Pauline Hanson's One Nation and the Katter's Australian Party and achieved lowest major party votes in QLD history.

The Firearm Owners United which is a new gun rights group which also in 2017 made its first financial contribution to a campaign during the Queensland state election, donating $1,000 to Pauline Hanson's One Nation party and Katter's Australian Party.

Background

Previous election 

At the 2015 election, Labor won 44 seats, the most of all parties, but short by one of commanding a majority in the Legislative Assembly. The Liberal National Party, despite winning a record majority of 78 at the previous election, won 42 seats. Katter's Australian Party won two seats, and the independent member for Nicklin, Wellington, retained his seat.

Wellington gave confidence and supply support to Labor to form government, giving it the majority of 45 out of 89 seats in parliament, and consequently the previous Liberal National government under the leadership of Campbell Newman, who lost his seat of Ashgrove, lost office after one term.

Calling of election
After Labor's retraction of endorsement for MP Rick Williams on 27 October 2017, the party's seat count dropped to 41, equalling that of the LNP. Several media sources reported that Premier Palaszczuk would call a snap election. On 29 October Palaszczuk asked the Acting Governor Catherine Holmes to dissolve parliament and a writ was issued for a 25 November state election.

Pre-election pendulum

Following the 2015 election, Cook MP Billy Gordon was expelled from the Labor Party. He was later joined on the crossbench by two other Labor MPs, Rob Pyne (Cairns) and Rick Williams (Pumicestone). LNP MP Steve Dickson also joined the crossbench following his defection to One Nation. The final seat tally at dissolution was 41 Labor, 41 LNP, 2 KAP, 1 PHON and 4 IND.

Redistribution
With the expansion of the Assembly from 89 to 93 seats, a redistribution of district boundaries was finalised on 26 May 2017.

A number of seats were renamed, either to reflect boundary changes or to honour distinguished Queenslanders: Ashgrove became Cooper, Beaudesert became Scenic Rim, Brisbane Central became McConnel, Cleveland became Oodgeroo, Indooroopilly became Maiwar, Kallangur became Kurwongbah, Mount Isa became Traeger, Sunnybank became Toohey, and Yeerongpilly became Miller.

The LNP-held seat of Albert, the KAP-held seat of Dalrymple and the Labor-held seat of Mount Coot-tha were abolished, while a number of new seats were created: Bancroft (notionally Labor); Bonney (notionally LNP); Hill (notionally KAP); Jordan (notionally Labor); Macalister (notionally Labor); Ninderry (notionally LNP); and Theodore (notionally LNP). Additionally, the LNP-held seats of Mansfield and Mount Ommaney became notionally Labor, while the Labor-held seat of Pumicestone became notionally LNP.

Antony Green calculated a notional seat tally of 47 Labor, 44 LNP, 1 KAP and 1 independent under the new boundaries.

Voting method
Having used optional preferential voting since 1992, in 2016 the Queensland Parliament reintroduced compulsory preferential voting, which requires voters to allocate preferences to all candidates running in their single-member electorate. The election was conducted by the Electoral Commission of Queensland, an independent body answerable to Parliament.

Queensland had a maximum parliamentary term of three years, measured from the deadline set for the return of the electoral writs, but as a result of the 2016 term length referendum Queensland has fixed four-year terms from 2020 onwards. The previous state election was held on 31 January 2015.

Date
Following the successful 2016 referendum to introduce four-year fixed-term elections, this was the last Queensland election where the date of the election could be chosen at the serving Premier's discretion.

Section 84 of the Electoral Act 1992 stated that an election must be held on a Saturday, and that the election campaign must run for a minimum of 26 or a maximum of 56 days following the issue of the writs including the day the writ drops and polling day. Five to seven days following the issue of the writs, the electoral roll is to be closed, which gives voters a final opportunity to enrol or to notify the Electoral Commission of Queensland of any changes in their place of residence.

The Constitution (Fixed Term  Parliament) Amendment Act 2015, which amended the Constitution of Queensland to provide for state elections on the fourth Saturday in October every four years, did not come into effect until the 2020 election. Therefore, this was the last election to which section 2 of the Constitution Act Amendment Act 1890 applied before its repeal. It provided that the Legislative Assembly continues for no more than three years from the day set for the return of writs for the previous election, after which time the Legislative Assembly expires.

The day set for the return of writs for the 2015 election was 16 February 2015, but the deadline appointed in the writ for its return was Wednesday 11 March 2015. The Electoral Act requires the Governor to issue writs for a general election no more than four days after the Legislative Assembly is dissolved or expires. The last possible day for the next election was therefore a Saturday not more than 56 days beyond four days after the expiry of the Legislative Assembly on 11 March 2018, namely 5 May 2018.

Palaszczuk faced constant media questions during 2017 about whether she would call an early election. She stated that it was her intention to hold it in 2018, and that it would take something "extraordinary" for it to be held in 2017. Following Agriculture Minister Bill Byrne's resignation on health grounds and the disendorsement of Pumicestone MP Rick Williams, on Sunday 29 October 2017, she announced the election would be held on 25 November 2017. Pauline Hanson described this as a "cowardly" move, given that she was overseas on a federal parliamentary trip and would be delayed in starting her One Nation party's campaign.

As the election was held in 2017, this meant that the fixed date for the next state election was on 31 October 2020. Had the election instead been held in 2018, the next fixed election date would have been 30 October 2021.

Key dates

Contesting parties

The ALP's Queensland branch and the LNP are two of six parties registered with the Electoral Commission of Queensland by October 2017, alongside the Queensland Greens, the Queensland division of Pauline Hanson's One Nation, Katter's Australian Party, and Civil Liberties, Consumer Rights, No-Tolls. Queensland's two-party dominance was threatened by the resurgence of One Nation, given former LNP MP Steve Dickson's defection to become One Nation's state leader in January 2017 and the high-profile candidacy of recently-disqualified Senator Malcolm Roberts, and the record strength of the Greens in several urban seats bolstered by Brisbane's first Green councillor Jonathan Sriranganathan (then known as Sri) being elected in 2016.

Preferences
The ALP and The Greens pledged to place One Nation candidates last on their respective party How-To-Vote cards. Both parties also placed each other ahead of the LNP on their cards. Katter's Australia Party exchanged preferences with One Nation in the seats they both contested. The LNP placed Greens candidates below ALP candidates, and placed One Nation candidates ahead of the ALP in 52 of the 61 seats One Nation was contesting, the exceptions being in Buderim, Logan, Mudgeeraba, Nicklin, Coomera, Scenic Rim, Stretton, Toohey and Thuringowa. One Nation, with a few notable exceptions, placed all ALP and LNP sitting MPs last. One Nation also made an agreement with Katter's Australia Party, not to challenge the two sitting KAP MPs in their respective seats.

Retiring MPs
The following Members of the Queensland Legislative Assembly have announced their intention to not contest the 2017 state election:

Labor
Bill Byrne (Rockhampton) – announced 7 October 2017

Liberal National Party
Verity Barton (Broadwater) – lost preselection 28 May 2017; did not re-nominate
Ian Rickuss (Lockyer) – announced 12 November 2016
Jeff Seeney (Callide) – announced 2 March 2017
Lawrence Springborg (Southern Downs) – announced 3 December 2016

Independent
Billy Gordon (Cook) – elected as Labor; announced 31 October 2017
Peter Wellington (Nicklin) – announced 16 February 2017

Opinion polling
Several research, media and polling firms conduct opinion polls during the parliamentary term and prior to the state election in relation to voting. Most firms use the flow of preferences at the previous election to determine the two-party-preferred vote; others ask respondents to nominate preferences.

Primary vote opinion polling graph

Two-party preferred opinion polling graph

See also 

Politics of Queensland

References

External links
2017 State General Election (Electoral Commission Queensland)
Queensland Votes (ABC Elections)

Elections in Queensland
2017 elections in Australia
2010s in Queensland
November 2017 events in Australia